Kita-Sanjūyo-Jō Station (北34条駅) is a Sapporo Municipal Subway station in Kita-ku, Sapporo, Hokkaido, Japan. The station number is N02.

Platforms

Surrounding area
 Japan National Route 5, (to Hakodate)
 Japan National Route 274, (to Shibecha)
 Post Office, Sapporo Kita-Sanjūyo-Jō
 Police Station, Kita-Sanjūyo-Jō Post
 Sapporo Justice Bureau, Kita branch
 Best Denki, Sapporo branch
 Sapporo shinkin Bank, Kita branch

External links

 Sapporo Subway Stations

Railway stations in Japan opened in 1978
Railway stations in Sapporo
Sapporo Municipal Subway
Kita-ku, Sapporo